The Stain is a 1984 novel of sexuality and religion by Rikki Ducornet, set in France's Loire Valley in the nineteenth century. It was Ducornet's first published novel; she has described it as being "about the Christian idea of sin".

Plot
Towards the end of the nineteenth century, in the rural village of La Folie in France's Loire Valley, a girl is born with a birthmark on her face shaped like a dancing hare. After both her parents die young, Charlotte is raised by her uncle, a mild-mannered gardener with a stutter, and her aunt, a strict disciplinarian who regards her niece's birthmark as the brand of Satan. As Charlotte grows up, she tries to make sense of the world around her under the influence of her aunt and the other characters, including a travelling conman, a local exorcist, the village tramp, and a nearby community of nuns that eventually accepts Charlotte as a novitiate. The world around La Folie is a mysterious place: Charlotte sees religious signs everywhere, an ancient menhir stands just outside town, wolves prowl in the woods nearby, and the village exorcist is torn between serving God and serving Beelzebub.

Development history
The village of La Folie is based on Le Puy-Notre-Dame, in the Maine-et-Loire department, where Rikki Ducornet lived with her French husband for twenty years. (Nearby villages Louerre and Louresse are mentioned in the novel.) The book was written in Le Puy, and Ducornet has described the book's genesis as stemming from a dream fuelled by encounters with real people in the village:

The book took three years to complete and was written "in a fever". Many of the characters were based on real people, including the exorcist.

Publication history
1984, United Kingdom, Chatto & Windus, hardback
1984, United States, Grove Press, hardback
1995, United States, Dalkey Archive Press, paperback

References

External links
A Conversation with Rikki Ducornet

1984 American novels
Novels set in the Loire Valley
Chatto & Windus books
Grove Press books